Ramiz Mammadali Oglu Aliev (15 December 1946, Amirjan, Baku - ) better known by his pen name Rovshan is Azerbaijani poet, writer and translator.
The national poet of Azerbaijan (2019).

Poet and film script writer Ramiz Rovshan was born in Baku on December 15, 1946. Rovshan graduated from the Philology Faculty of Azerbaijan State University (1969). He took a two-year filmmaking course in Moscow in 1978. He is the author of several poetry books such as "One Rainy Song" (1970), "The Sky Can’t Hold a Stone" (1987) and "Butterfly Wings" (1999), novels and stories "Stone" (1979), "Pain" (1978), "Stories of Amirjan" (2001), "Breath" (2006) etc.

Several films are based on his scripts: "The Grandfather of my Grandfather's Grandfather" (1981), "The reapers from City" (1985), "The Pain of Milk Tooth" (1988), "Strange Time" (1996) (This movie was awarded with "The Best Movie" at the First International Madrid Film Festival in 1997), "The Melody of Place" (2001), etc.

Rovshan’s poems and stories have been translated into most of the languages of former Soviet Republics and published in the USA, Germany, UK, France, Poland, Yugoslavia, Bulgaria, Turkey and Iran.

Currently Ramiz Rovshan is the Editor-in-chief of "Azerbaijanfilm" film studio. He is a member of Azerbaijan Writers’ Union and Republican Council of Media. He also is the chairman of the Committee of "Struggle against election fraud and repressions".

Works 
 Bir yağışlı nəğmə (One Rainy Song) - Baku - 1970
 Göy üzü daş saxlamaz (The Sky Can’t Hold a Stone) - Baku - 1987
 Kəpənək qanadları (Butterfly Wings) - Baku - 1999
 Gedək biz olmayan yerə (Let's go to the place which we are not there) - Baku - 2006
 Nəfəs - kitablar kitabı (Breath - Book of the books) - baku - 2006
 Göy üzü daş saxlamaz (The Sky Cannot Hold a Stone) - Tehran - 2007
 Nəfəs - kitablar kitabı (Breath - Book of the books) - Ankara - 2008
 Yağışlı nəğmə (Rainy song) - Tehran - 2009
 Sevgi məktubu kimi (Like a love letter) - Baku - 2009
 Yağış yuyur, gün qurudur (Rain rinses, sun dries) - Tehran - 2011

References

External links 

 

Translators to Azerbaijani
1946 births
20th-century Azerbaijani poets
Living people
21st-century Azerbaijani poets
Azerbaijani male poets
20th-century male writers
21st-century male writers